Friedhoff is a surname. Notable people with the surname include:

 Dietmar Friedhoff (born 1966), German politician
 Paul Friedhoff (1943–2015), German politician